The following is a list of programs broadcast by the Nick Jr. channel. It was launched on September 28, 2009 as a spin-off of Nickelodeon's long-running preschool programming block of the same name, which has aired since 1988. The channel features original series and reruns of programming from Nickelodeon's weekday morning lineup. A late-night programming block aimed at parents, NickMom, aired on Nick Jr. from October 1, 2012 to September 28, 2015.

The channel replaced Noggin, which was relaunched as a streaming service in 2015 and acts as a separate sister brand. Noggin's programming is distinct from the Nick Jr. channel's; it mainly carried pre-teen-oriented programs at its launch, and its 2015 streaming service features a variety of exclusive series.

Current programming

Original programming

Animated series

Live-action series

Acquired programming

Animated series

Programming on Pluto TV 
Pluto TV, a streaming service purchased by Viacom in 2019, includes a channel dedicated to Nick Jr. programming, along with a Latino feed. The lineup consists of discontinued series from the Nick Jr. block and the TV channel. 
 1 Latino feed only. This is the feed for Pluto US and not to be confused with the Latin America version.
 2 English feed only.

Interstitial programming

Upcoming programming

Original programming

Animated series

Acquired programming

Animated series

Former programming

Original programming

Animated series

Live-action series

Acquired programming

Animated series

Live-action series

Former Pluto TV programming

Former special events

Former interstitials

 All Together Now (2012–2015)
 Art Alive (2009–2010)
 Arts and Crafts (2009–2012)
 Bedtime Business (2009–2015)
 The Big Green Help (2009–2010)
 Canticos (2018)
 Chickiepoo and Fluff: Barnyard Detectives (2009–2012)
 Count It Up (2012–2015)
 Critter Corner (2009–2012)
 Field Trip (2009–2012)
 Get A Move On (2012–2015)
 Get Creative (2012–2015)
 Getting Going (2009–2012)
 Moose and Zee (mascots; 2009 – March 1, 2012)
 Move to the Music (2009–2012)
 Nickelodeon Music (2012–2015)
 Nick Jr. Presents (2009–2012)
 The Olive Branch (2010–2012)
 Peppa Pig (shorts; 2009 – February 4, 2011)
 Pocoyo (shorts; 2010 – July 22, 2011)
 Nick Jr. Show and Tell
 Say it 2 Ways (2009–2015)
 Show and Tell (2009–2010)
 Story Time (2009–2015)
 SuperSonic Science (2012–2015)
 Word of the Day (2012–2015)
 Word Play (2012–2015)
 WorldWide (2012–2015)

NickMom

Original series

NickMom acquired series 
Parenthood was acquired and exclusive to NickMom. Other series were acquired via Nick at Nite.

Repeats of ViacomCBS series

See also
 List of programs broadcast by Nickelodeon
 List of programs broadcast by Nick at Nite
 List of programs broadcast by Nicktoons
 List of programs broadcast by TeenNick
 List of films broadcast by Nickelodeon

Notes

References

Nick Jr.
Lists of television series by network
Nickelodeon-related lists